Mae Phrik, Chiang Rai is a village and tambon (sub-district) of Mae Suai District, in Chiang Rai Province, Thailand. In 2005 it had a population of 5,808 people. The tambon contains 13 villages.

References

External links

Tambon of Chiang Rai province
Populated places in Chiang Rai province